The Bench is a Welsh television legal drama series, co-created by Matthew Robinson and lead writer Catherine Treganna, that first broadcast on BBC One Wales from 17 October 2001. The English-language series follows the daily lives of a group of the prosecutors and defenders of a busy magistrates court, including long suffering Des Davies (Mark Lewis Jones) and young whippersnapper Ranjit Singh (Phaldut Sharma).

Two series of the programme were broadcast, having been filmed back-to-back during the summer of 2001. The series was initially broadcast at 8:30pm on Fridays on BBC One Wales, before being repeated in their entirety an afternoon slot nationwide on BBC One from 27 May 2002. A late night repeat on BBC Two followed in June 2008. The series won three BAFTA Cymru awards in 2003, with Eiry Thomas winning Best Actress, Bill Broomfield winning Best Director of Photography for a drama series and Will Oswald winning Best Editor.

Neither series has been released on DVD, but in 2020, both were released in their entirety on Amazon Prime Video under a deal with Acorn TV, making them available in the United States for the first time.

Cast
 Mark Lewis Jones as Des Davies
 Phaldut Sharma as Ranjit Singh
 Eiry Thomas as Cheryl Cates
 Eluned Jones as Val Sullivan
 Philip McGough as Peter Mansell
 Clive Willbond-Hill as Colin Francis
 Roger Evans as Hugh Evans
 Brian Hibbard as Ralph Jenkins
 Lesley Vickerage as Katharine Tyrell
 Anita Reynolds as Nita Jones
 Martin Cole as Wayne Hayward
 Rachel Isaac as Ange Collins
 Siwan Morris as Leanne Phillips

Episodes

Series 1 (2001)

Series 2 (2002)

Notes

References 
 My name should be Bond WalesOnline interview with Martin Cole.
 Dennis and Joan celebrating roles in Spielberg blockbuster WalesOnline interview with Dennis and Joan Williams.

External links 
 The Bench BBC programme page.
 The Bench on IMDb.

Welsh television shows
British drama television series
2000s Welsh television series
2001 British television series debuts
2004 British television series endings
2000s British drama television series